, also called HappinessCharge Pretty Cure! or Happiness Charge PC is a 2014 Japanese magical girl anime series produced by Toei Animation, and the eleventh installment in Izumi Todo's Pretty Cure metaseries, released to celebrate the franchise's 10th anniversary. It is directed by Tatsuya Nagamine, who previously directed HeartCatch PreCure!, and written by Yoshimi Narita, who previously wrote for Yes! PreCure 5, with character designs from Masayuki Sato of Air Gear. 

It began airing in Japan from February 2, 2014 to January 25, 2015, succeeding DokiDoki! Precure in its initial timeslot. The series' main topic is love, with the Cures' motifs are fashion styles and dance moves. It features trading cards, mirrors, and changing forms as important key elements. It was then succeeded by Go! Princess PreCure on February 1, 2015.

Plot
The ruler of the evil , Queen Mirage, begins her invasion on Earth using an army of Choiarks and powerful monsters called Saiarks. All across the world, Pretty Cures are dispatched to fight against the Phantom Empire threat.

This person turns out to be Megumi Aino, a kind-hearted girl always looking to help others, who is recruited by Hime to fight by her side as Cure Lovely. Using the power of the Pretty Cards and their changing forms, alongside Cure Honey and Cure Fortune, they form the Happiness Charge Pretty Cure team as they are given the task to collect all of the Pretty Cards and protect the Earth against the Phantom Empire.

Characters

HappinessCharge Pretty Cures 
The Pretty Cures are legendary Warriors of Light who are chosen to protect the Earth from evil threats. Each of these Cures were assigned to different parts of the globe in order to fend off against the Phantom Empire one by one. In addition to transformation, the PreCards can also be used to change outfits both in and outside of battle, offering new powers or abilities, and are said to grant wishes to whoever gathers enough of them.

HappinessCharge Pretty Cure, the protagonist team of this story, consist of the four Cures that are currently active in Pikarigaoka City from Japan. They also can use the Shining Make Dresser, the Axia's true form in order to execute their group finishing attack. In addition to the attack items and main forms, the Cures can also undergo another transformation, called Innocent Form through the power of the special PreCards. However to activate this form, each Cure must have a reason to protect someone they cherish deeply; as it is the only way to unlock the said PreCards.

Together, they introduce themselves as 

 

The main protagonist. A 14-year-old student in her second year of Public Pikarigaoka Academy. Her redeeming features are her happy-go-lucky attitude and her smile. When people feel troubled or depressed, she unintentionally meddles in their issues. Though she is sometimes lacking in tact and her attempts at helping others often end in failure, she thoroughly looks to the positive and is skilled at seeing the good in people. She has an interest in cute fashion, but her fashion sense is not exactly the best. Her wish is to cure her sick mother, who influenced her to help others.
Chosen by the Crystal of Love thrown by Hime, she transforms into the elegant Cure Lovely. As Cure Lovely, her dark magenta hair turns bright magenta and is tied into a ponytail. She uses the LovePreBrace to attack and alternate into alternate forms like  that uses fire-based attacks,  that uses music-themed attacks, and her Innocent form.
As Super Happiness Lovely, she introduced as  As Forever Lovely, she introduced herself as  Her theme color is pink.

 

She is rather selfish and spoiled, and is currently living with Blue and Ribbon in an embassy located in Pikarigaoka City. To rescue the Blue Sky Kingdom from the Phantom Empire, she became a Pretty Cure, though initially struggled because of how scared she gets. Because of her shyness, she had trouble making new friends, but after meeting Megumi and becoming partners with her, she starts to open up more and become more confident. Her wish is to restore her homeland, hoping that one day she will atone for her mistake.
 In episode 25, she once develops a temporary crush on Seiji and worries about becoming a rival of Megumi, but she later founds out that she is happier to support Megumi and Seiji.
 As Cure Princess, her dark aqua hair becomes light blue and is tied into twin tails.
Her theme color is blue.

 

Megumi's 13-year-old classmate and best friend, who she nicknames "Yuyu". Coming from a bento shop family, she often practices cooking and enjoys tasting different kinds of food. She is also known for her homemade honey candy, which she gives to others to cheer them up. Her wish is to share delicious food with the people she cares about. She once had a dog and was inspired to cook food for the sake of people's happiness.
In episode 10, she reveals herself to be the singing Pretty Cure, Cure Honey, who had received a Crystal of Love from Blue prior to the start of the series and first appeared in Pretty Cure All Stars New Stage 3: Eien no Tomodachi, officially joining the team in episode 11. As Cure Honey, her straight brown hair turns blond and is tied up in a ponytail. Her main weapon is the Triple Dance Honey Baton, which uses three modes; Microphone Mode for singing soothing melodies that put her enemies in a trance, Ribbon Mode which lets her tie up her opponents with ribbons, and Maracas Mode which lets her heal her allies.
Her theme color is yellow.

 

A cool purple-haired 15-year-old girl from Megumi's neighboring class and the head apprentice of her grandfather, the master of "Hikawa Karate Dojo". She is known for her good academic performance in her school and her determination. Her wish is to become stronger so she can defeat Phantom and rescue her sister. Her arch-rival is Phantom.
In the beginning of the story, she appears as a fierce Pretty Cure with a strong sense of duty and justice who works alongside her own fairy partner, Glasan. She is quite powerful and has excellent fighting abilities, though also shows a gentle side to citizens. Unlike the other Cures, who received their powers from Blue, Cure Fortune received her powers from her older sister, Maria as Cure Tender, who has been defeated by Phantom and trapped inside a mirror.
Having generally resolved to fight on her own in her pursuit of Phantom, she slowly warms up to Megumi's words of teamwork and eventually reveals her identity to the group in episode 19. Iona initially held a strong grudge against Hime for releasing the Phantom Empire from their prison at first. During a battle with Phantom, she loses her PreCards she got from Maria, along with her ability to transform. However, after Hime apologizes and gives her her own PreCards to fill her PreCard File, Iona uses her wish to gain the power to transform again, making up with Hime and officially joining the group afterwards. Her transformation device is the Fortune Piano whilst her main weapon is the Fortune Tambourine.
Her theme color is purple.

Blue Sky Kingdom

Hime's mediator, who comes to Japan along with her, serving as fairy partner for Megumi, Hime, and Yuko. Despite her cute appearance, she is silver-tongued and much more gutsy than Hime. She has the ability to convert the positive feelings of those freed from the Phantom Empire's mirrors into PreCards. She often ends her sentences with "desu wa", "deshita wa", "masu wa" or "mashita wa".

Iona's fairy partner. Usually very calm like her partner, Glasan can convert positive feelings into PreCards for Iona to use. She often ends her sentences with "da ze". She speaks in a rebellious language.

He travels to different countries in order to find candidates for new Pretty Cures, bestowing Crystals of Love onto them which grant them their powers. He usually survey the Pretty Cures inside the mirror world as well, using magic mirrors to see any trouble caused by the Phantom Empire. Originally staying in Blue Sky Kingdom for a long time, he comes to Japan along with Hime and Ribbon to watch them and their team battle against the Phantom Empire. Blue is later revealed to have a past with Queen Mirage when she was a Pretty Cure and unknowingly caused her descent into evil through Red, who is later revealed to be his estranged brother. After Red made his peace with him, Blue decides to leave earth in the Pretty Cures' hands as he decides to help restore Red's planet.
King and Queen
Hime's parents and rulers of the Blue Sky Kingdom, who were trapped in the mirrors along with the other denizens when the Phantom Empire invaded the Blue Sky Kingdom. After Mirage's defeat, they were released along with the other residents and reunited with Hime.

Phantom Empire
The  are the main antagonists of the series. Having conquered the Blue Sky Kingdom after being released from the  box by Hime, setting up their base of operations there, the Phantom Empire set their sights on Earth by having their Saiarks terraform the environment while replacing love and happiness with sorrow and misfortune. It is eventually revealed that they were being used by Deep Mirror, who used Mirage as a bewitched figurehead to act through before she is purified. Red then proceeds to summon the Red Planet in a plot to conquer the world with his armies of Saiarks, only to repent once defeated.

Leaders
 

The main antagonist of the series and the ruler of the Phantom Empire, Red is a spirit who once oversaw the Red Planet. But after the Red Planet's people died out, Red became hateful and made his goal to turn the world under the protection of his brother Blue into a place of chaos by anger and hatred. Red assumed the alias of Deep Mirror for most of the series, appearing as a silhouette within a mirror. While he presents himself as Queen Mirage's advisor and often give orders to the commanders, his true role in the Phantom Empire is revealed when he intervened to stop the commanders from being purified and he influenced Mirage further through her love-spurred anger towards Blue before she is eventually purified. This forces Red to take a more active approach in destroying the Pretty Cures, using Seiji as his new servant while summoning the red planet for a worldwide attack. But after losing his follower, Red personally battles the Pretty Cures before being defeated by Megumi as Forever Lovely. After his defeat, Red finally reconciles with Blue and decides to restore his planet to its former glory with the aid of his brother and Mirage. He is based on the Magic Mirror from Snow White.

  

The secondary antagonist of the series and the queen of the Phantom Empire, resembling a butterfly and wields a staff, Queen Mirage detests loves and happiness. In reality, as the Pretty Cures learn, Mirage was actually a shrine maiden of Pikarigaoka who met Blue 300 years ago and developed feelings for him as she fought by his side as Cure Mirage. But after Blue left her, Mirage fell under the influence of Red and ended up in her current state through the entity augmenting her anger towards Blue. Her Saiarks creates fog and utter chaos. The Cures eventually managed to defeat Mirage and restore her to her original form in episode 43. In episode 48, she transforms into Cure Mirage again to help the other Pretty Cures in stopping Red's invasion. She later decides to accompany Blue in helping his brother Red to restore his own planet. Mirage's motif is based on Kyary Pamyu Pamyu's costume worn in the promotional video of Tsukematsukeru. Her outfit is reused colors from Regina's outfit from Doki Doki PreCure.

Commanders
They serve as Mirage's elite minions. Each of the commanders' environment depending which Saiarks they created. Namakelder, Hosshiiwa and Oresky form into the group called , while Phantom and Madam Momere are sole commanders. They have the powers to trap people into the mirror and create Saiarks, which took away their love and happiness.

 The leader of the three Phantom Empire's main commanders, he appears as a strict and egotistical militant who wears a Saiark's glasses shaped on his hat. His Saiarks turn the environment into barrens wastelands and sometimes it will creates dark clouds. In episode 29, he almost become good but he was snapped by Deep Mirror. He was fully purified by Cure Fortune during the final battle. Oresky's name is based on the phrase  with his motif based on Ranba Ral from Mobile Suit Gundam. In the finale, he along with Namakelder and Hosshiwa were reborn. He is now a police officer in Pikarigaoka and is seen helping Mitsuya in episode 49.

One of the three Phantom Empire's main commanders, she appears as a selfish and wealthy lady with an apple-shaped head and umbrella who desires many things. Her Saiarks turn the environment into sweets food and desserts. In episode 29, she almost become good but she was snapped by Deep Mirror. She was fully purified by Cure Honey during the final battle. Hosshiwa's name is based on the word  and her motif is based on Marie Antoinette. In the finale, she along with Namakelder and Oresky were reborn. She is shown to be a kindergarten teacher in episode 49 and her name is revealed to be Ms. Hoshi.

One of the three Phantom Empire's main commanders, he appears as a smartly and intelligent dressed but lazy man who has grasshopper's antennae coming out of his hat and holding a cane. His Saiarks spread mold everywhere and also immuned to Cure Honey's song. In episode 29, he almost become good but he was snapped by Deep Mirror. He was fully purified by Cure Princess during the final battle. Namakelder's name is based on the word  and his motif is based on the grasshopper from the fable The Ant and the Grasshopper. In finale, he along with Hosshiwa and Oresky were reborn. He is shown to be a businessman in episode 49 and his name is revealed to be Namase (生瀬).

   

Phanphan is Cure Mirage's fairy partner similar to Ribbon and Glassan. But while Mirage was under the influence of Red, Phanphan transformed into a human version of himself and came to be known as Phantom. His Saiarks turn the environment into amethyst mines and crystal. Phantom also holds a strong grudge against Blue for breaking Mirage's heart and intends to destroy anyone he sees as harmful to his mistress. Phantom accepts Cure Fortune as his arch-rival as he targets her and the other Pikarigaoka Pretty Cures, once using his powers to absorb Megumi's shadow to become the female Cure Unlovely. Eventually, after the Pretty Cures treat his injuries after losing to him, Phantom begins to have second thoughts of them as Yuko allows him to return to Mirage's side. But Deep Mirror later influences Phantom to attack the Pretty Cures before they purify him to his original form. In episode 49, he chooses to stay with the Pretty Cures on Earth and is now working in Yuko's father's Bento shop. His overall armament were inspired from Monster Hunter.

One of Phantom Empire's commanders, she appears as a flamboyant, cool-headed and charismatic bearded androgynous-like lady who wears lipstick and jewelry and dresses up like band. She enjoys seeing people argue among themselves and tells them to leave behind rather than helping each other. Her Saiarks turn the environment into frozen lands. Unlike the other commanders targeting Pikarigaoka, Momere is mostly assigned to conquer Hawaii and deal with the Aloha Pretty Cure duo.

The monsters of the series, which are distinguished by their sunglasses and scarves. They are summoned when a commanders of the Phantom Empire traps an innocent human within a dark mirror, reflecting their happiness into darkness and suffering. When they are defeated, the trapped human is freed and their positive feelings are converted by a fairy into PreCards. Their name is derived from the Japanese word . While most Saiarks possess scarfs reflecting the member of the Phantom Empire who summoned them, Red possesses his own personal legions of red-colored Saiarks.

A group of underlings that work for the Phantom Empire, wearing black suits with white gloves and boots and red sunglasses. They never speak proper sentences but only say 'choi' and always take orders from the commanders. Their names are derived from the Japanese word . They turn white when they get purified by a Pretty Cure's attack in their Form Change.

Pikarigaoka Residents

Megumi's neighbor and classmate. A 14-year old boy who has been friends with Megumi since childhood and understands her strengths and weaknesses. He is an apprentice in the local "Hikawa Karate Dojo" (owned by Iona's family) and enjoys diligently training everyday. Though being somewhat popular among girls, claiming to have no romantic interest, Seiji secretly has feelings for Megumi. In fact, helping them after learning of Megumi being a Pretty Cure, Seiji kept his emotions bottled up as she failed to notice his feelings for her. It was because Red managed to recruit Seiji to his side by having the boy consumed by his emotions and develop feelings of hatred and anger towards Megumi. During the final showdown, Megumi expresses her own feelings of love towards Seiji for everything he did for her and their friends so she and the others can free him from Red's influence. While fighting Red, he, along with Ribbon and Glasan were imprisoned into a mirror while protecting Megumi.

An eager reporter who hosts a TV show titled Pretty Cure Weekly, which reports news about Pretty Cures from around the world. Having been saved by a Pretty Cure in the past, she desired to become one herself and dedicated herself to learning everything about them. She comes to learn of the HappinessCharge Pretty Cure's identities after Megumi offers to help her become a Cure. Although she was given a Crystal of Love by Blue, it did not react to her, which Blue believes is because she already has a role in this world. She is based on the Yes!

Megumi's mother. She spends most of her time with Megumi whilst her husband is away on business trips. Despite having a weak body and constantly having to take medicine, she maintains a positive attitude and is the one who influenced Megumi to help others out.

Megumi's father. He was on a business trip while his wife spends time with Megumi.

Seiji's younger sister, who is quite friendly with Megumi.

Seiji and Mao's mother. Her work as a courier leaves her little time with her children, who usually have dinner with the Ainos.

Yuko's mother. She runs the bento shop "Omori Gohan" with her husband and two daughters.

Yuko's father.

Yuko's older sister.
 & 

Yuko's grandfather and grandmother. They live and grow rice in the nearby Pikari Mountain. Their rice is directly supplied to "Omori Gohan".

Megumi's homeroom teacher, who is very capable of managing her students even if they can be a handful.

Megumi's classmates.

Megumi, Hime, Yuko and Seiji's classmate and member of the baseball club, he usually has the lowest test scores in their class.

Megumi's classmate. A member of the karate club and Iona's fellow apprentice.

Seiji's classmate. He becomes interested in Iona and wants to date with her, but they have a rough relationship.

Other Pretty Cures

Unlike previous seasons of the Pretty Cure franchise, this season is unique at having multiple Pretty Cure teams active at one time in addition to the main team. The earth god Blue has granted the power of Pretty Cure to girls all over the world in order to combat the global threat of the Phantom Empire. The Cure teams range from having one member to multiple members and operate in their own countries of origin, though some large countries, such as the United States, have multiple teams active over different areas. The Cure's outfits are all designed around the same standard theme but usually have regional variations based on the native culture. It is unclear how many Cures are active in total, but in episode 21, Phantom reveals that when he defeats a Cure and traps them in a mirror, he sends them to the Pretty Cure graveyard, where there were over one hundred defeated Cures. After Mirage's defeat, they were all released and return to their own world.
 
  

Iona's older sister, who was defeated by Phantom whilst protecting Iona from his attack. After becoming trapped in a mirror by Phantom, her Pretty Change Mirror was taken by Iona, who used it to become Cure Fortune. Her disappearance is explained as being studying abroad to her close friends and family. Later, Mirage released her and manipulate her to fight her sister and the other Cures as Dark Tender. The Cures manage to saves her from Mirage's influence and she decides to go to America to visit her parents and help the other Cures. She later returns to Pikarigaoka to defend it from Red's Saiarks along with the other Cures while the Happiness Charge Cures travel to Red Planet.

America's Pretty Cure team, consisting of three Cures. The pink Cure has a curly blonde ponytail and wears a little hat. The blue Cure has red curly pigtails with a star hair accessory. The yellow Cure has loose silver hair with a brown headband and a feather in her hair. Their theme is the Wild West.

The sole member of France's Pretty Cure team, . She has long blonde hair in wormtails, and wears a pink hair accessory on her head. Her weapon is a giant paintbrush with a red ribbon. 

India's Pretty Cure team, consisting of two Cures. The orange Cure has short orange hair tied up and a yellow head scarf, and wears a green jewel head accessory on her head. The green Cure has long up-tight green hair and a short white head scarf. She wears an orange jewel and a gold oval on her forehead and in her hair. Both Cures wear glasses in their Cure form. Their theme is technology.

Hawaii's Pretty Cure team, formed of twin sisters Ohana and Olina, who become Cure Sunset and Cure Wave respectively. Together, they introduce themselves as 
 

The elder twin of the Alo~ha Pretty Cure, who wields the power of the sun.
 

The younger twin of the Alo~ha Pretty Cure, who wields the power of waves.

Ohana and Olina's fairy partner. She ends her sentence with lolo.

Unidentified International Cures
Nothing is known about them besides their appearance and current location.

England's Pretty Cure team consists of only one known Cure, who is confirmed to be . Cure Continental has bright yellow hair held up with a blue bow, and blue eyes. She also wears white, spade-shaped earrings. Continental is defined as coming from or characteristic of mainland Europe or an inhabitant of mainland Europe.

 is the only known Cure from Russia. She was seen in episode 14, being defeated by Phantom. Not much is known about her at the moment. Her Cure name, Katyusha, means a short form of the Russian name Ekaterina.

Her name most likely refers to the representation of the Southern Cross constellation on Australia's flag.

They are twins, both of them look the same and even have the same theme color as Cures. They have blonde-orange ponytails and orange eyes.

 is the only known Cure from Africa, and is originated from Egypt. She has blue hair in a ponytail she has a crown that embraces her whole head with a blue gem and a yellowish transparent cloth is hanging. She has blue collar she has a black vest that has a white design, her vest is shorter that her stomach was seen and attached to her vest are long puffy sleeves, she white wears a skirt-like with a golden lining which forms a "V" and a yellow cloth is hanging in front she also has a transparent loose yellowish leggings, she has a yellow pair of sandals.

Movie Characters

A girl whose wish is to become a ballerina dancer. She lost her legs' functionality by Black Fang and deceived her to stay in Doll Kingdom from Earth and he absorb her despair which to fuel his power.

A prince from Doll Kingdom. He is shown to have feelings for Tsumugi.

The main antagonist of the film and Phantom Empire's elite commander. A demonic man who created Doll Kingdom to deceived Tsumugi for staying there forever from Earth. He used Tsumugi's despair to fuel his power to conquer Earth but he was defeated by Cure Lovely in her Super Happiness Lovely form.

A yellow mascot from Funabashi, Chiba Prefecture.

Production
The series was first filed by Toei in the Japan Patent Office for a variety of goods on October 2, 2013, and made public on October 24, 2013. In an issue of Nikkan Sports PreCure Shimbun newspaper, Dokidoki! PreCure'''s producer, Hiroaki Shibata, confirmed the series and series writer Ryota Yamaguchi confirmed Dokidoki! PreCures 49 episode run and that HappinessCharge Precure! will air in the beginning of February 2014. The project was then officially revealed in the January 2014 issue of Kodansha's Tanoshi Yochien Magazine. The anime's form changing is also used in the ending and will make use of advanced 3D/CGI graphics and motion capture, which is used in the previous series' dancing ending videos.

On January 3, 2014, Megumi Nakajima of Macross Frontier fame announced she will voice the series' main character, Megumi Aino. She stated that Pretty Cure was something she has adored for a long time, so it was like a dream to be allowed to star in it herself. It is the first time she took another lead anime role after announcing her indefinite hiatus from her music career at the end of March 2014. A day later, the first commercial for the series was aired at the end of episode 46 in DokiDoki PreCure!, showcasing Cure Lovely and Cure Princess' transformations. On January 26, the trailer for the first episode is aired at the end of the final episode in DokiDoki PreCure!.

Media

Anime

The series began airing on ABC and other ANN stations from February 2, 2014, replacing DokiDoki! Precure in its initial timeslot with the Broadcasting System of San-in broadcasting on February 8, 2014. The first 34 episodes feature a special 10th anniversary message presented by one of the previous Pretty Cures in the franchise including the HappinessCharge Cures themselves. DVDs and Blu-rays of the series were released in volumes.

Film
The main characters of the series also appeared in the film Pretty Cure All Stars New Stage 3: Eternal Friends on March 15, 2014. The movie's single and soundtrack was released three days prior to the movie's premiere.

A spinoff movie of the series has also been revealed, titled  was released on October 11, 2014. The single and soundtrack for the movie was released on October 8, 2014, along with the anime's second ending theme single.

Music
The series uses three pieces of theme music, one opening theme and two ending themes. The single containing both songs was released by Marvelous AQL (later, Marvelous Inc.) on March 5, 2014. All of the theme songs are composed by Yasuo Kosugi except for Party Has Come, which is by Hizashi, and the background music is by Hiroshi Takaki, who previously composed DokiDoki! Precures background music. The first original soundtrack was released on May 21, 2014, with the title PreCure Sound Charge!! Also, the first vocal album was released on July 23, 2014, with the title Hello! Happiness Friends! featuring songs performed by the main characters of the anime along with the theme songs. On October 8, 2014, the single for the anime's second ending theme was released. The anime's second official soundtrack was released on November 5, 2014, with the title Precure Sound Big Bang!! Also, the second vocal album was released on November 19, 2014, with the title Shining ☆ Happiness Party. In addition, a vocal best album was released on January 14, 2015.

Manga
Like the series before it, a manga adaptation by Futago Kamikita began serialization in Kodansha's Nakayoshi magazine in March 2014.

Video games
The Pretty Cures debuted in HappinessCharge PreCure! are added in the new update of the Pretty Cure All Stars Data Carddass'' arcade game in February 2014. This update includes compatibility with the collectible PreCards. A video game based on the series, titled , developed by Bandai Namco Games was released on the Nintendo 3DS on July 31, 2014. The game features all the Pretty Cures from previous series, with early editions including a download code to unlock all the Cures from the start and three exclusive PreCards.

Merchandise
Throughout the anime's run, merchandise was released including watches, weapons, transformation items, cards, bags and many more. Most of them is by Bandai, the main sponsor of the series. Special PreCards was also released during the anime's course, beginning with promotional cards included in McDonald's Happy Meals in January 2014.

References

External links
 Official website at Toei Animation 
 Official website at Asahi Broadcasting Corporation 
 

2014 anime television series debuts
2015 Japanese television series endings
2015 comics endings
Magical girl anime and manga
Science fiction anime and manga
Extraterrestrials in anime and manga
Pretty Cure
Toei Animation television
TV Asahi original programming
Television series about alien visitations
Extraterrestrial superheroes
Japanese children's animated science fantasy television series
Fashion-themed television series
Dance in anime and manga